Me and My Grandma is a comedy series created by Eva Gutowski and Annie Stamell that premiered on March 22, 2017 on YouTube Red and Flying Bark Productions. The series stars Gutowski and Rhea Perlman and is executive produced by Stamell, Gutowski, Adam Wescott, Scott Fisher, and Jill Condon.

Premise
College graduate Janey and her grandmother move to Hollywood together and attempt to forge acting careers.

Cast and characters

Main
 Eva Gutowski as Janey Skalecki 
 Shelby Rabara as Heidi
 Kayla Ewell as Victoria
 Kelly Sry as Hank
 Steven Cox as Oliver
 Rhea Perlman as Grandma Skalecki

Recurring
 Lamont Thompson as Desmond
 Tara Moncure as Samantha
 David Gautreaux as George
 Sheila Carrasco as Agent

Guest
 Staci Greenwell as Barbra Skalecki ("Palm Tree Montage"), Janey's mother.
 Gigi Gorgeous as herself ("Elderboo")
 Joey Graceffa as Teen Boy ("Elderboo")
 Shevyn Roberts as Elizabeth ("Elderboo")

Episodes

Production

Development
On August 5, 2016, it was announced that YouTube had given the production a series order for a first season set to premiere in 2017 on YouTube Red. The series was created by Annie Stamell and YouTube celebrity Eva Gutowski both of whom were expected to executive produce alongside Jill Condon, Adam Wescott, and Scott Fisher with Condon also serving as the series' showrunner.

Casting
Alongside the initial series announcement, it was confirmed that the series would star Eva Gutowski.
On November 1, 2016, it was announced that Rhea Perlman had been cast in the role of the titular Grandma.

References

External links

2010s American comedy television series
2017 American television series debuts
2010s Australian comedy television series
2017 Australian television series debuts
YouTube Premium original series